Flaming Lips Alley is an alleyway in Bricktown, Oklahoma City, in the U.S. state of Oklahoma. The name of the street pays tribute to the band The Flaming Lips. Plans for the tribute were made public in 2006, and the alleyway was dedicated in 2007.

References

External links

 Oklahoma City, Oklahoma: Flaming Lips Alley at Roadside America
 Flaming Lips Alley - Oklahoma City, OK at Waymarking

2007 establishments in Oklahoma
Bricktown, Oklahoma City
Monuments and memorials in Oklahoma
Streets in Oklahoma
The Flaming Lips